Chase Tan (birthdate: 1 April 1990) is a Singaporean actor and basketball player who plays for the SBPHK Hornets in the Singapore National Basketball League and the Singapore national basketball team.

Early life and education
Chase Tan was born on 1 April 1990. He studied in Princess Elizabeth Primary School and Jurongville Secondary School. He started playing basketball while studying in secondary school, and was selected for his school team. Tan graduated from SIM University.

Career

Basketball career
When Tan was 19, he was spotted by Singapore's national coach Neo Beng Siang and was invited to be part of the Singapore Slingers. Tan played for the Singapore Slingers in the Asean Basketball League (ABL) from 2010 to 2015. As of 2019, he plays for the SBPHK Hornets in the National Basketball League.

Tan represented Singapore in major competitions such as the Southeast Asian Games. He took part in 2013, 2015 and 2019. He won bronze in the 2013 and 2015 edition.

Acting career 
Tan was talent-spotted in 2013 when he managed to be the top 12 finalist for Hey Gorgeous (season 2). In 2014, Tan made his film debut in a movie produced by Tay Ping Hui, Meeting the Giant (再见巨人). Tan made his Mediacorp acting debut in a drama series produced by Channel 8, Blessings.

Controversy
The fictional drama depicts Tan as Bai Shande, a paedophile basketball coach with sexually transmitted diseases who molested teenage boys. Bai was sentenced to jail and caning after his being arrested for his crimes.

The appearance of the character sparked controversy for its alleged discrimination against the LGBTQ community in Singapore, to which Mediacorp and also Tan himself made official apologies for the feature and assured the LGBTQ public that they had no intent to discriminate the LGBTQ in Singapore.

Filmography

Awards and accolades
Legend :   Gold   Silver   Bronze      QR: Qualifying Round

References

External links

1990 births
Living people
Competitors at the 2013 Southeast Asian Games
Competitors at the 2015 Southeast Asian Games
Competitors at the 2019 Southeast Asian Games
Shooting guards
Singapore Slingers players
Singaporean sportspeople of Chinese descent
Singaporean television personalities
Singaporean male television actors
Singaporean actors
Singaporean men's basketball players
Southeast Asian Games bronze medalists for Singapore
Southeast Asian Games medalists in basketball